Proline rich acidic protein 1 is a protein that in humans is encoded by the PRAP1 gene.

References

Further reading